Kevin Roy Winterbottom (1955 to 9 June 1976) was a South African Air Force (SAAF) pilot who chose to avoid crashing his stricken Impala jet aircraft in the Monument Park suburb of Pretoria by remaining with his aircraft to the end.  He was posthumously awarded the 25th Honoris Crux decoration for bravery, the first such award for gallantry outside battle. The HC was at the time South Africa's highest military decoration that could be awarded in peacetime.

Early life 
Winterbottom was born in Pretoria, Transvaal Province, South Africa. He attended Pretoria Boys High School where he matriculated in 1972.

Service and fatal accident 
Winterbottom joined the SAAF in 1973, entering Officer and Pilot training.  He was serving with 4 Squadron at the time of his death.

On the morning of 9 June 1976, Winterbottom was piloting Atlas MB326 km Impala Mk II #1022. While making his approach to land at Waterkloof Air Force Base an engine failure due to a bird strike left him with no thrust and insufficient altitude to reach the airfield. His options were to eject and risk the aircraft crashing with possible casualties in the suburban areas of Waterkloof or Monument Park in Pretoria, or to remain with his aircraft and guide it away from populated areas. He chose the latter, steering his aircraft to crash in a small deserted recreation park where he was killed instantly on impact.

Winterbottom's ashes were scattered at the SAAF Memorial.

References

External links
 Remembrance Day service held on 11 November 2008, address by Rear-Admiral (JG) Derek Christian, SA Navy.

1955 births
1976 deaths
White South African people
People from Pretoria
South African military personnel killed in action
South African Air Force officers
South African military personnel of the Border War